The Dreissenidae are a family of small freshwater mussels, aquatic bivalve molluscs. They attach themselves to stones or to any other hard surface using a byssus. The shells of these bivalves are shaped somewhat like those of true mussels, and they also attach themselves to a hard substrate using a byssus, however this group is not at all closely related to true mussels, being more closely related to the venus clams (Veneridae).

Genera
Genera within the family Dreissenidae include:
 Congeria, a unique genus of cave-dwelling bivalves
 Dreissena, the type genus of the family
 Mytilopsis
 Rheodreissena, a newly described South American genus

Shell morphology

The shells of species of mussels in this family range from 20–40 mm in their maximum dimension, and about half as wide across. The shell outline is bent, with one margin usually somewhat incurved, and the other strongly curved outwardly. The shell is opaque and robust; in coloration it is yellowish, brownish or greyish, often with light-and-dark stripes.

Biology and ecology

These mussels breathe via complex gills. They live in clean, well oxygenated, lowland rivers, canals and reservoirs, attaching to stones and other hard surfaces; they will also tolerate slightly brackish water.

Geographical range of distribution

In Britain there is only one species from this family, Dreissena polymorpha, the zebra mussel, which is a troublesome invasive species. In the USA, both D. polymorpha and D. bugensis are problematic introduced species.

References

External links
 

 
Bivalve families